Chumphon Buri is a district (amphoe) in the northwestern part of Surin province, northeastern Thailand.

History
The district dates back to Mueang Chumphon Buri, which was converted into a district during the thesaphiban administrative reform c. 1900.

On 22 February 1938 the eastern part of the district was split off to form Tha Tum district. The remaining district was considered to be too small to be a full district and was thus reduced to a minor district (king amphoe) on 4 March 1938. On 20 February 1953 it regained full district status.

Geography
Neighboring districts are (from the north clockwise): Phayakkhaphum Phisai of Maha Sarakham province; Kaset Wisai of Roi Et province; Tha Tum of Surin Province; and Satuek, Khaen Dong, Khu Mueang and Phutthaisong of Buriram province.

Administration
The district is divided into nine sub-districts (tambons), which are further subdivided into 122 villages (mubans). Chumphon Buri is a township (thesaban tambon) and covers parts of tambon Chumphon Buri. There are a further nine tambon administrative organizations (TAO).

References

External links
amphoe.com

Chumphon Buri